East Homer is a hamlet in Cortland County, New York, United States. East Homer had a post office until June 17, 1995; it still has its own ZIP code, 13056.

References

Hamlets in Cortland County, New York
Hamlets in New York (state)